Maamendhoo as a place name may refer to:
 Maamendhoo (Gaafu Alif Atoll) (Republic of Maldives)
 Maamendhoo (Laamu Atoll) (Republic of Maldives)
 Maamendhoo (Seenu Atoll) (Republic of Maldives)